John W. Klepper (October 23, 1906 – November 13, 1997) is a former Democratic member of the Pennsylvania House of Representatives.

References

Democratic Party members of the Pennsylvania House of Representatives
1906 births
1997 deaths
20th-century American politicians